Caherkinmonwee Castle, also known as Caher Castle, is a tower house located in County Galway, Ireland.

Location

History

The tower house was built some time in the 15th century. In 1574 it was held by Myler Henry Burke.

It was in ruins for two centuries until 1996, when stonemason and artisan Peter Hayes purchased and renovated it; he still lives there with his partner and children. It is now available as an Airbnb rental, with the castle's master bedroom described as the most popular room on the website.

Description
The tower house is well-preserved and stands five storeys tall, with bartizans on each corner and a spiral staircase in the southeast. It has machicolation and Irish crenellations. The new roof was built with local oak, slate and no nails.

References

Castles in County Galway
15th-century establishments in Ireland
Tower houses in the Republic of Ireland